Citrus medica x aurantium may refer to one of several hybrids between a citron and sour orange:

Bizzaria, a graft hybrid between a Florentine citron and sour orange.
Lemon, Citrus limon, any of the various commercially prominent citron-sour orange hybrids.
Pompia, Citrus medica tuberosa, a hybrid between a Diamante citron and a sour orange.
Rhobs el Arsa, a hybrid between a Diamante citron or common poncire citron and a sour orange.